Sveg Airport is an airport in Sveg, Sweden .

Airlines and destinations

Statistics

See also
 List of the largest airports in the Nordic countries

References

Airports in Sweden